The Fatal Legacy is a 1723 tragedy by the British writer Jane Robe. It was inspired by Jean Racine's 1664 play La Thébaïde. It concerns the children of Oedipus in Ancient Thebes.

The original Lincoln's Inn Fields cast included Anthony Boheme as Eteocles, Lacy Ryan as Polynices, James Quin as Creon, Thomas Walker as Phocias, Thomas Smith as Alcander, John Egleton as Attalus, Anna Maria Seymour as Jocasta and Jane Rogers as Antigona. The prologue was written by Charles Beckingham.

References

Bibliography
 Burling, William J. A Checklist of New Plays and Entertainments on the London Stage, 1700-1737. Fairleigh Dickinson Univ Press, 1992.
 Nicoll, Allardyce. A History of Early Eighteenth Century Drama: 1700-1750. CUP Archive, 1927.
 Staves, Susan. A Literary History of Women's Writing in Britain, 1660–1789. Cambridge University Press, 2006.

1723 plays
British plays
West End plays
Tragedy plays